Micrurapteryx is a genus of moths in the family Gracillariidae.

Species
Micrurapteryx bidentata Noreika, 1992
Micrurapteryx caraganella (Hering, 1957)
Micrurapteryx fumosella Kuznetzov & Tristan, 1985
Micrurapteryx gerasimovi Ermolaev, 1982
Micrurapteryx gradatella (Herrich-Schäffer, 1855)
Micrurapteryx kollariella (Zeller, 1839)
Micrurapteryx occulta (Braun, 1922)
Micrurapteryx parvula Amsel, 1935
Micrurapteryx salicifoliella (Chambers, 1872)
Micrurapteryx sophorella Kuznetzov, 1979
Micrurapteryx sophorivora Kuznetzov & Tristan, 1985
Micrurapteryx tibetiensis Bai & Li, 2013
Micrurapteryx tortuosella Kuznetzov & Tristan, 1985

External links
Global Taxonomic Database of Gracillariidae (Lepidoptera)

Gracillariinae
Gracillarioidea genera